William A. Loy (May 5, 1895 – June 18, 1982) was an American farmer and politician.

Born in Livingston, Wisconsin, Loy graduated from Livingston High School. He served in the United States Army during World War I and then United States Navy during World War II. Loy went to the college of agriculture at the University of Wisconsin–Madison. He was a farmer and raised horses and cattle. He served on the Livingston High School board and was president of the village of Fennimore, Wisconsin, where he lived. Loy was a deputy undersheriff and chief of police. Loy served as a Republican in the Wisconsin State Assembly in 1953. Loy died on June 18, 1982, at the Good Samaritan Center in Fennimore, Wisconsin.

Notes

1895 births
1982 deaths
People from Livingston, Wisconsin
School board members in Wisconsin
Mayors of places in Wisconsin
Republican Party members of the Wisconsin State Assembly
University of Wisconsin–Madison College of Agricultural and Life Sciences alumni
People from Fennimore, Wisconsin
20th-century American politicians